The diocese of Hà Tĩnh is a Roman Catholic diocese in central Vietnam. Paul Nguyễn Thái Hợp was appointed its first bishop when the diocese was erected on December 22, 2018.

References

Hà Tĩnh
Hà Tĩnh
2018 establishments in Vietnam
Christian organizations established in 2018